Tie Break is a successful and "significant" Polish jazz rock group, formed in Częstochowa in 1977. The group was formed by guitarist Janusz Iwański and the bassist Krzysztof Majchrzak, and was soon joined by flute player Grzegorz Chmieleck.
The current lineup includes Janusz Iwański, Marcin Pospieszalski, Antoni Gralak and Mateusz Pospieszalski.
The group has performed at notable venues such as the Jazz Jamboree.

Selected discography
 1989 – Tie Break, Polskie Nagrania
 1990 – Duch wieje, kędy chce – Edycja św. Pawła
 1991 – Gin gi lob, Silton
 1995 – Poezje ks. Jana Twardowskiego, Edycja św. Pawła
 1995 – retrospekcja. koncert. Kraków (Soyka, Yanina i Tie Break), Pomaton

References

Polish jazz ensembles
Musical groups established in 1977
Culture in Częstochowa